Herfabach is a river located in Hersfeld-Rotenburg, Hesse, Germany.  in length, it is a west tributary of the Werra. It has a river basin area of 40.011 km ².

See also

List of rivers of Hesse

References

Rivers of Hesse
Rivers of Germany